The 2008 Pavel Roman Memorial was the 14th edition of an annual international ice dancing competition held in Olomouc, Czech Republic. The event was held between November 14 and 16, 2008. Ice dancers competed in the senior, junior, and novice levels.

Results

Senior

External links
 results

Pavel Roman Memorial, 2008
Pavel Roman Memorial